UFC Fight Night: Holohan vs. Smolka (also known as UFC Fight Night 76) was a mixed martial arts event held on October 24, 2015, at 3Arena in Dublin, Ireland.

Background
The event was the third that the organization has hosted in Dublin, following UFC 93 in January 2009 and UFC Fight Night: McGregor vs. Brandao in July 2014.

The event was expected to be headlined by a lightweight bout between Dustin Poirier and Joseph Duffy. However, Duffy was forced to pull out of the fight on October 21, three days prior to the event, after sustaining a concussion during a sparring session earlier that week and the fight was scrapped. A flyweight bout between Paddy Holohan and Louis Smolka was promoted to serve as the event's new headliner. It was the first three-rounds main event bout since The Ultimate Fighter: Team Rousey vs. Team Tate Finale in November 2013.

The co-main event was expected to feature a heavyweight bout with potential UFC Heavyweight Championship title implications between Stipe Miocic and Ben Rothwell. However, Miocic pulled out of the fight on October 14 citing injury. Subsequently, Rothwell was removed from the card the following day after the promotion deemed that a suitable opponent could not be arranged on short notice.

Results

Bonus awards
The following fighters were awarded $50,000 bonuses:
Fight of the Night: Darren Till vs. Nicolas Dalby
Performance of the Night: Neil Seery and Tom Breese

See also
List of UFC events
2015 in UFC

References

2015 in Irish sport
2015 in mixed martial arts
Mixed martial arts in Ireland
Sports competitions in Dublin (city)
UFC Fight Night
2010s in Dublin (city)
October 2015 sports events in Europe